Sir James Gray,  (14 October 1891, London – 14 December 1975, Cambridge, England) was a British zoologist who helped establish the field of cytology. Gray was also known for his work in animal locomotion and the development of experimental zoology. He is known for Gray's Paradox concerning dolphin locomotion.

Career and research
Gray was born in London and graduated from King's College, Cambridge, in 1913.  After serving in World War I, he returned to King's College in 1919. He was Professor of Zoology, Cambridge University, from 1937 to 1954, and president of the Marine Biological Association from 1945 to 1955. Post-retirement, Gray become president of the Eugenics Society between 1962-1965

Awards and honours
Gray delivered the Croonian Lecture of 1939 to the Royal Society and received their Royal Medal in 1948. He gave the 1951 Royal Institution Christmas Lectures (How Animals Move). Gray was knighted in 1954 and elected a Fellow of the Royal Society (FRS) in 1931.

References

1891 births
1975 deaths
20th-century British zoologists
Fellows of the Royal Society
Fullerian Professors of Physiology
Royal Medal winners
Knights Bachelor
People from Wood Green
Alumni of King's College, Cambridge
Commanders of the Order of the British Empire
Professors of Zoology (Cambridge, 1866)
Scientists from London